Dean Fuleihan (born January 27, 1951) is an American civil servant, who served as First Deputy Mayor of the City of New York from 2018 to 2021. Previously, he served as the budget director of the New York City Mayor's Office of Management and Budget, and the New York State Assembly chief fiscal and policy advisor for over 30 years, and as a vice president at SUNY College of Nanoscale Science and Engineering.

Early life and education
Fuleihan earned a Bachelor of Arts degree in economics from Alfred University and studied public finance at the Maxwell School of Citizenship and Public Affairs at Syracuse University.

Career
Fuleihan began his career as a policy analyst in the New York State Assembly in 1978. He worked as a budget analyst and rose to become long-time Speaker Sheldon Silver's "budget guru", in charge of negotiating New York State's $130 billion budget. Fuleihan retired from the Assembly in 2011 and joined the SUNY Poly College of Nanoscale Science and Engineering as an executive vice president.

Bill de Blasio hired Fuleihan after his victory in the 2013 mayoral election. His first main task as the Budget Director for the Office of Management and Budget (OMB) was negotiating labor contracts that previous mayor, Michael Bloomberg, had left expire for years. Under de Blasio and Fuleihan, the budget of New York City has grown from $72 billion to $85 billion.

In late November, 2017, First Deputy Mayor Anthony Shorris announced he would step down from his post, and de Blasio offered the job to Fuleihan, who accepted the role as First Deputy Mayor effective January, 2018. Fuleihan was replaced as Budget Director at OMB by Melanie Hartzog.

Personal life
Fuleihan is of Lebanese descent.

References

External links
 New York City Mayor's Office of Management and Budget

American people of Lebanese descent
New York (state) Democrats
Alfred University alumni
Living people
21st-century American politicians
20th-century American politicians
American civil servants
Deputy mayors of New York City
Maxwell School of Citizenship and Public Affairs alumni
1951 births